Local elections were held in Pasay City, Philippines on May 13, 2013 as part of the general elections. Voters elected the mayor, vice-mayor, representative of the city's lone district in House of Representatives and six members of the city council in each district.

Background 
Mayor Antonino "Tony" Calixto ran for second term. He was challenged by Former Mayor Wenceslao "Peewee" Trinidad, businessman Jorge Del Rosario, and perennial candidate Romulo "Rome" Marcelo.

Vice Mayor Marlon Pesebre ran for second term. He was challenged by Former Second District Councilor  and defeated 2010 vice mayoral candidate Noel "Onie" Bayona, defeated 2010 mayoral candidate Ricardo "Ding" Santos, and Former Acting Second District Councilor Joven "Jojie" Claudio, son of former Mayor Dr. Jovito Claudio.

Representative Imelda "EmI" Calixto-Rubiano ran for second term. She was challenged by Former Acting City Administrator Atty. Santiago "Sonny" Quial and Pastor De Castro Jr.

Candidates

Administration's Ticket

Team Calixto

Opposition Team

Team Pesebre

Team JDL

Team Peewee

Team Kaibigan

Results
Names written in bold-Italic are the re-elected incumbents while in italic are incumbents lost in elections.

For Representative
Rep. Imelda Calixto-Rubiano defeated former Acting City Administrator Santiago "Sonny" Quial.

For Mayor
Mayor Antonino Calixto defeated businessman Jorge del Rosario and former Mayor Wenceslao "Peewee" Trinidad.

For Vice Mayor
Vice Mayor Marlon Pesebre defeated former Second District Councilor Noel "Onie" Bayona and retired Police Ricardo "Ding" Santos.

For Councilors

First District 
Five of six incumbent councilors were re-elected, except from Pinky Lyn Francisco, who placed 7th. The newly-elected councilor was Jennifer Roxas, wife of former Rep. Jose Antonio "Lito" Roxas placed 2nd.

Former Councilors Uldarico "Ric" Arabia and Ma. Luisa "Bing" Petallo failed to seek city council comeback. Nelfa Delfin-Trinidad, former City First Lady and wife of former Mayor Wenceslao "Peewee" Trinidad lost, placing 10th.

|-bgcolor=black
|colspan=5|

Second District
Only two out of six incumbent councilors were re-elected successfully. Re-electionists Ian Vendivel and Reynaldo Padua Sr. both elected for third and final term. 

Three out of four winners are former councilors who successfully made a comeback in city council. Allan Panaligan, placing first, was defeated as representative in both 2007 and 2010 elections. Arvin "Bong" Tolentino and Arnel Regino "Moti" Arceo, placing fourth and fifth respectively, were the vice mayoral candidates in 2010 who lost to then First District Councilor Marlon Pesebre. 

Re-electionists Edita Vergel de Dios, Ileana Ibay, and Brian Bayona, placing eight, ninth, and tenth respectively, failed to secure a seat in the city council.

|-bgcolor=black
|colspan=5|

References

Elections in Pasay
2013 Philippine local elections
2013 elections in Metro Manila